The Eastport Peninsula is a small extension of land into the central part of Bonavista Bay in the Canadian province of Newfoundland and Labrador. The peninsula is adjacent to Terra Nova National Park and contains seven small communities: Eastport, Happy Adventure, Sandy Cove, Salvage, St. Chad's,  Burnside and Sandringham.

Geography
The Eastport Peninsula is a small peninsula in the central part of Bonavista Bay. The peninsula extends from Terra Nova National Park and follows an irregular coastline along Newman Sound to the south, around the community of Salvage, around Salvage Bay to the east and then following Damnable Bay, Morris Channel, Fair and False Bay, Bloody Reach and Northeast Arm on the north.

Economy
Work in the region traditionally focused on the abundant natural resources. Inshore fishing, farming, and logging were still the chief source of employment for most of the inhabitants well into the 20th century.  The lumber industry, however, faded away with the development of Terra Nova National Park in the 1950s. Happy Adventure is still a site of an operational fishplant (2017).

Being adjacent to Terra Nova National Park and having sandy beaches the Eastport Peninsula has become one of Newfoundland's most popular tourist destinations. The Eastport Peninsula is part of The Road to The Beaches tourism region.

The peninsula is home to the annual Winterset in Summer Literary Festival.

List of communities in Newfoundland and Labrador

Burnside
Eastport
Happy Adventure
Salvage
Sandringham
Sandy Cove
St. Chad's

External links

The Town of Eastport

Peninsulas of Newfoundland and Labrador